Desmond Clarkson (25 January 1923 – January 2002) was an English professional rugby league footballer who played in the 1940s and 1950s.

Biography
Des Clarkson was born in Tadcaster, West Riding of Yorkshire, England, and he died aged  in Pontefract, West Yorkshire, England.

Playing career

International honours
Des Clarkson won caps for England while at Hunslet in 1947 against Wales, and in 1948 against France.

Challenge Cup Final appearances
Des Clarkson played  in Halifax's 4-4 draw with Warrington in the 1954 Challenge Cup Final during the 1953–54 season at Wembley Stadium, London on Saturday 24 April 1954, in front of a crowd of 81,841, and played  in the 4-8 defeat by Warrington in the 1954 Challenge Cup Final replay during the 1953–54 season at Odsal Stadium, Bradford on Wednesday 5 May 1954, in front of a record crowd of 102,575 or more.

References

External links
(archived by archive.is) History → Into The Sixties
Ex-Thrum Haller Traill dies, aged 75
Search for "Des Clarkson" at britishnewspaperarchive.co.uk

1923 births
2002 deaths
Castleford Tigers players
Date of death missing
England national rugby league team players
English rugby league players
Halifax R.L.F.C. players
Hunslet F.C. (1883) players
Keighley Cougars players
Leeds Rhinos players
Leigh Leopards players
People from Tadcaster
Rugby league locks
Rugby league players from Yorkshire
Rugby league second-rows